The Path She Chose is a 1920 American silent drama film, directed by Phil Rosen. It stars Anne Cornwall, J. Farrell MacDonald, and Claire Anderson, and was released on May 24, 1920.

Cast list
 Anne Cornwall as Virginia
 J. Farrell MacDonald as Father
 Claire Anderson as Sister
 Genevieve Blinn as Forewoman
 Dagmar Godowsky as Marie
Kathleen O'Connor as Tess
 Edward Coxen as Parker
 William Moran as Frank
 Harry Schumm as Client

References

External links 
 
 
 

American silent feature films
Silent American drama films
1920 drama films
1920 films
Films directed by Phil Rosen
Universal Pictures films
American black-and-white films
1920s English-language films
1920s American films
English-language drama films